The Iowa State Cyclones football statistical leaders are individual statistical leaders of the Iowa State Cyclones football program in various categories, including passing, rushing, total offense, and receiving, and defensive stats. Within those areas, the lists identify single-game, single-season, and career leaders. The Cyclones represent Iowa State University in the NCAA's Big 12 Conference.

Although Iowa State began competing in intercollegiate football in 1892, the school's official record book considers the "modern era" to have begun in 1943. Records from before this year are often incomplete and inconsistent, and they are generally not included in these lists.

These lists are dominated by more recent players for several reasons:
 Since 1943, seasons have increased from 10 games to 11 and then 12 games in length.
 The NCAA didn't allow freshmen to play varsity football until 1972 (with the exception of the World War II years), allowing players to have four-year careers.
 Bowl games only began counting toward single-season and career statistics in 2002. The Cyclones have played in six bowl games since then.
 Six of the Cyclones' nine highest seasons in total offensive yards have come since 2000.

These lists are updated through Week 3 of the 2022 season.

Passing

Passing yards

Passing touchdowns

Rushing

Rushing yards

Rushing touchdowns

Receiving

Receptions

Receiving yards

Receiving touchdowns

Total offense
Total offense is the sum of passing and rushing statistics. It does not include receiving or returns.

Total offense yards

Total touchdowns

Defense

Interceptions

Tackles

Sacks

Kicking

Field goals made

Field goal percentage

See also
History of Iowa State Cyclones football
List of Iowa State Cyclones football seasons
List of Iowa State Cyclones football All-Americans
List of Iowa State Cyclones in the NFL Draft

References

Lists of college football statistical leaders by team